Hancock Field is a former airport and military airfield about  south-southeast of Santa Maria, California.   Also known as Santa Maria Municipal Airport, the airport was closed about 1959 and today is the site of Allan Hancock College.

History
Hancock Field was founded in 1927 by Captain Allan Hancock and became the community's airport the following year. The Hancock Foundation College of Aeronautics was established in 1928. Ten-week classes were offered prospective pilot candidates, with successful individuals becoming licensed pilots. The first students graduated in 1929.

During World War II the United States Army Air Forces contracted with the Hancock Foundation College of Aeronautics to provide basic flight (level 1) instruction to aviation cadets beginning on 14 September 1940. Known sub-bases and auxiliaries:
 Santa Maria Auxiliary Field  
 La Brea Auxiliary Field      
 Mckinnon Auxiliary Field     (Undetermined)
 Souza Auxiliary Field        
 Waller-Franklin Auxiliary Field  

Fairchild PT-19s were the primary trainer used. Performed contract training until 27 June 1944 with the drawdown of AAFTC's pilot training program.

Private flight training continued until the late 1950s when the airfield was closed.

See also

 California World War II Army Airfields
 36th Flying Training Wing (World War II)

References

 Manning, Thomas A. (2005), History of Air Education and Training Command, 1942–2002.  Office of History and Research, Headquarters, AETC, Randolph AFB, Texas 
 Shaw, Frederick J. (2004), Locating Air Force Base Sites, History’s Legacy, Air Force History and Museums Program, United States Air Force, Washington DC.

External links
  Abandoned & Little-Known Airfields: (Original) Hancock Field

1927 establishments in California
Santa Maria, California
History of Santa Barbara County, California
Airfields of the United States Army Air Forces in California